Blaise Dago Adou (born 3 November 1985, in Abidjan) is an Ivorian football defender playing for Séwé Sports de San Pedro.

International career
Adou was selected Ivory Coast national football team the 2009 African Championship of Nations 2009 in Ivory Coast.

References

1985 births
Living people
Ivorian footballers
Footballers from Abidjan
Sabé Sports players
Ivory Coast international footballers
Issia Wazy players
Séwé Sport de San-Pédro players

Association football defenders
Ivory Coast A' international footballers
2009 African Nations Championship players